Fiji is a group of volcanic islands in the South Pacific, lying about   southwest of Honolulu and  north of New Zealand. Of the 332 islands and 522 smaller islets making up the archipelago, about 106 are permanently inhabited.

Viti Levu, the largest island, covers about 57% of the nation's land area, hosts the two official cities (the capital Suva, and Lautoka) and most other major towns, such as Nausori, Vaileka, Ba, Tavua, Kororvou, Nasinu, and Nadi (the site of the international airport), and contains some 69% of the population.  Vanua Levu,  to the north of Viti Levu, covers just over 30% of the land area though is home to only some 15% of the population.  Its main towns are Labasa and Savusavu. In the northeast it features Natewa Bay, carving out the Loa peninsula.

Both islands are mountainous, with peaks up to  rising abruptly from the shore, and covered with tropical forests. Heavy rains (up to  annually) fall on the windward (southeastern) side, covering these sections of the islands with dense tropical forest. Lowlands on the western portions of each of the main islands are sheltered by the mountains and have a well-marked dry season favorable to crops such as sugarcane.

Other islands and island groups, which cover just 12.5% of the land area and house some 16% of the population, include Taveuni southeast off Vanua Levu and Kadavu Island, south off Viti Levu (the third and fourth largest islands respectively), the Mamanuca Group (just off Nadi) and Yasawa Group (to the north of the Mamanucas), which are popular tourist destinations, the Lomaiviti Group (just off Suva) with Levuka, the former capital and the only major town on any of the smaller islands, located on the island of Ovalau, and the remote Lau Group over the Koro Sea to the east near Tonga, from which it is separated by the Lakeba Passage.

Two outlying regions are Rotuma,  to the north, and the uninhabited coral atoll and cay Ceva-i-Ra or Conway Reef,  to the southwest of main Fiji. Culturally conservative Rotuma with its 2,000 people on  geographically belongs to Polynesia, and enjoys relative autonomy as a Fijian dependency.

Fiji Television reported on 21 September 2006 that the Fiji Islands Maritime and Safety Administration (FIMSA), while reviewing its outdated maritime charts, had discovered the possibility that more islands could lie within Fiji's Exclusive Economic Zone.

More than half of Fiji's population lives on the island coasts, either in Suva or in smaller urban centers. The interior is sparsely populated because of its rough terrain.

Statistics
 Location
 Oceania, island group in the South Pacific Ocean; Geographic coordinates:
 
 Map references
 Oceania
 Area
 Total: 
 Land: 
 Water: 
 Area – comparative
 Slightly smaller than New Jersey; slightly less than one third Nova Scotia's size; slightly smaller than Wales
 Land boundaries
 
 Coastline
 
 Maritime claims
 Measured from claimed archipelagic baselines
 Territorial sea: 
 Exclusive economic zone: . 
 Continental shelf:  depth or to the depth of exploitation; rectilinear shelf claim added
 Terrain
 Mostly mountains of volcanic origin, beaches
 A recent global remote sensing analysis suggested that there were 438km² of tidal flats in Fiji, making it the 49th ranked country in terms of tidal flat area.
 Elevation extremes
 Lowest point: Pacific Ocean 
 Highest point: Mount Tomanivi 
 Natural resources
 Timber, fish, gold, copper, offshore oil potential, hydropower
 Land use
 Arable land: 9.03%
 Permanent crops: 4.65%
 Other: 86.32% (2011)
 Irrigated land
  (2003)
 Total renewable water resources
  (2011)
 Freshwater withdrawal (domestic/industrial/agricultural)
 total:  (30%/11%/59%)
 per capita:  (2005)
 Natural hazards
 Cyclonic storms can occur from November to January
 Environment – current issues
 Deforestation; soil erosion
 Environment – international agreements
 Party to: Biodiversity, Climate Change-Kyoto Protocol, Desertification, Endangered Species, Law of the Sea, Marine Life Conservation, Ozone Layer Protection, Tropical Timber 83, Tropical Timber 94, Wetlands
 Signed, but not ratified: None of the selected agreements
 Geography – note
 Includes 322 islands and islets of which approximately 110 are inhabited

Climate 
Fiji has a tropical rainforest climate and a tropical monsoon climate (Af and Am according to the Köppen climate classification). Suva, the capital city, receives more rainfall than Nadi or the other side of Viti Levu. El Niño and La Niña events have significant impacts on rainfall. Tropical cyclones can impact Fiji and in some cases they can cause severe damage and many deaths. In 2016, Cyclone Winston caused widespread destruction and affected hundreds of thousands of people after striking Fiji. A few years later, Cyclone Harold also caused widespread damage. 

Climate change in Fiji is an exceptionally pressing issue for the country - as an island nation, Fiji is particularly vulnerable to rising sea levels, coastal erosion and extreme weather. These changes, along with temperature rise, will displace Fijian communities and will prove disruptive to the national economy - tourism, agriculture and fisheries, the largest contributors to the nation's GDP, will be severely impacted by climate change causing increases in poverty and food insecurity. As a party to both the Kyoto Protocol and the Paris Climate Agreement, Fiji hopes to achieve net-zero emissions by 2050 which, along with national policies, will help to mitigate the impacts of climate change.

Tectonics 
Fiji is located on the northeast corner of the Indo-Australian Plate near where it subducts under the Pacific Plate on the North Fiji Basin microplate between the North Fiji Fracture Zone on the north and the Hunter Fracture Zone on the south. It is part of the Ring of Fire, the string of volcanoes around the boundary of the Pacific Ocean.

Extreme points 
This is a list of the extreme points of Fiji, the points that are farther north, south, east or west than any other location.

 Northernmost point – Uea Island, Rotuma, Eastern Division
 Easternmost point – Vatoa Island, Eastern Division
 Southernmost point – Ceva-i-Ra island, Western Division
 Westernmost point –  Viwa Island, Western Division

Ecology

Fiji has more than three hundred islands, four of which are of a significant size. From largest to smallest, these four islands are Viti Levu, Vanua Levu, Kadavu Island, and Taveuni Island. The Fiji islands are home to numerous indigenous flora and fauna. These include:
 Brachylophus bulabula
 Fiji banded iguana
 Fiji crested iguana

References

 

pt:Fiji#Geografia